The Congregation of the Sisters of St. Paul of Chartres (SPC) is a Roman Catholic religious apostolic missionary congregation of pontifical right for teaching, nursing, visiting the poor and taking care of orphans, the old and infirm, and the mentally ill. It was founded in Levesville-la-Chenard, France in 1696.

The interior spirit is a love of sacrifice and labor for the spiritual and temporal good of others. The Postulancy lasts from six months to one year, the novitiate two years, after which the sisters take vows annually for three to seven years, and then perpetual simple vows.

History
In 1696, the congregation was founded by Father Louis Chauvet, the parish priest of Levesville-la-Chenard, a little French village and Marie-Anne de Tilly, a young women from a noble family. Chauvet enlisted three volunteers. Their first house belonged to Father Chauvet. 

The first superior, Marie Michau, died in 1702, She was succeeded by Marie-Anne de Tilly, who died the following year. In 1708 the small community of sister was entrusted to the Bishop of Chartres, Paul Godet des Marais. The bishop gave them a small house and the Apostle Paul as a patron. The house formerly belonged to a sabot-maker, and this gave them the name of "les Sœurs sabotières de Saint-Maurice", by which they were originally known.

In 1727, the Sisters were asked by Louis XV to establish a foreign mission at Cayenne in French Guiana. The congregation was dispersed under the Terror, during the French Revolution, but was restored by Napoleon I, who gave the sisters a monastery at Chartres, which originally belonged to the Jacobins, from which they became known as "les Sœurs de St. Jacques".

Beyond France
The sisters expanded their missionary work to the Islands of Martinique in 1818. They settled in England in 1847 at the invitation of Cardinal Wiseman.

By 1902 they had over two hundred and fifty houses in France where, besides various kinds of schools, they undertook asylums for the blind, the aged, and the insane, hospitals, dispensaries, and crèches. By 1913, more than one hundred and sixty of these schools had been closed, also thirty of the hospitals, military and civil, in the French colonies, three convents at Blois and a hospice at Brie. On the other hand they had in the meanwhile opened five or six hospitals overseas. 

In 1904, seven Sisters came to the Philippines from Saigon, Vietnam at the invitation of Bishop Frederick Z. Rooker, bishop of Jaro. They opened a girls' boarding school in Dumaguete. Over time, they developed St. Paul University System, which became known for training nurses.

Hong Kong
The first Sisters of St. Paul de Chartres arrived in Hong Kong in 1848. Institutions founded by the Sisters include:

 St. Paul's Convent School
 St. Paul's Secondary School
 St. Paul's School (Lam Tin)
 St. Paul's Hospital (Hong Kong)
 St. Teresa's Hospital

Core values

See also
Paulists
Sisters of Charity

References

 The entry cities:
Steel, Convents of Great Britain (London, 1902)

External links
Official website
Sisters of Saint Paul - Selly Park

Notre Dame Educational Association
Catholic female orders and societies